CIITA is a human gene which encodes a protein called the class II, major histocompatibility complex, transactivator.  Mutations in this gene are responsible for the bare lymphocyte syndrome in which the immune system is severely compromised and cannot effectively fight infection. Chromosomal rearrangement of CIITA is involved in the pathogenesis of Hodgkin lymphoma and primary mediastinal B cell lymphoma.

Function 
CIITA mRNA can only be detected in human leukocyte antigen (HLA) system class II-positive cell lines and tissues. This highly restricted tissue distribution suggests that expression of HLA class II genes is to a large extent under the control of CIITA.  However, CIITA does not appear to directly bind to DNA. Instead CIITA functions through activation of the transcription factor RFX5. Hence CIITA is classified as a transcriptional coactivator.

The CIITA protein contains an acidic transcriptional activation domain, 4 LRRs (leucine-rich repeats) and a GTP binding domain. The protein uses GTP binding to facilitate its own transport into the nucleus. Once in the nucleus, the protein acts as a positive regulator of class II major histocompatibility complex gene transcription, and is often referred to as the "master control factor" for the expression of these genes.

CIITA expression is induced by interferon gamma, possibly assisted by other signals. MHC II expression in intestinal epithelial cells is upregulated under inflammation.

Interactions 

CIITA has been shown to interact with:

 MAPK1, 
 Nuclear receptor coactivator 1, 
 RFX5, 
 RFXANK, 
 XPO1,  and
 ZXDC.

See also 
 MHC class II

References

External links 
 
 
 

LRR proteins
NOD-like receptors